Tostedt is a railway station located in Tostedt, Germany. The station is located on the Wanne-Eickel–Hamburg railway and Wilstedt-Zeven-Tostedt railway. The train services are operated by Metronom.

Train services
The following services currently call at the station:

Regional services  Bremen - Rotenburg - Tostedt - Buchholz - Hamburg
Local services  Bremen - Rotenburg - Tostedt - Buchholz - Hamburg

References

Railway stations in Lower Saxony